The Episcopal Church of the Mediator is an Episcopal parish church in the Kingsbridge section of The Bronx, New York.

The parish was formed on August 15, 1855, as The Church of the Mediator, Yonkers. Two years later, the first church for the parish was constructed at the cost of $5,000. The church was consecrated by Bishop Horatio Potter on November 6, 1864.

In 1902, the parish opted to create a new church. Henry Vaughan, the architect who designed the Washington National Cathedral, designed the church in a neo-Gothic style. The cornerstone bears the date 1911. This church was consecrated in 1927 by Bishop William Thomas Manning, who called it "the little cathedral of the Bronx" in reference to its size, design, and architectural details.

The church incorporates Tiffany favrile glass windows, including an unusual variant on the "Jesus Blessing the Little Children" Tiffany Studios design by artist Frederick Wilson, two large terra-cotta panels by George Tinworth, and a massive narthex window featuring figures of Jane Addams and Booker T. Washington. The church also features a Skinner organ.

The Episcopal Church of the Mediator is home to the Corlear Sycamore, also known as the Sister Tree, which is considered to be among the oldest and largest trees in The Bronx. The property currently hosts the Kingsbridge community refrigerator and environmental ministry, and houses several community outreach programs.

References
 Campbell, Rev. John (Rector): HISTORY OF THE CHURCH OF THE MEDIATOR (1858 - 1909). New York, 1910. 92 pages. Frontispiece: Line drawing of "NEW CHURCH OF THE MEDIATOR KINGSBRIDGE AVENUE, NEW YORK CITY (in course of construction)"

Episcopal church buildings in the Bronx
Kingsbridge, Bronx